Joaquin Andre Ditan Domagoso (born October 24, 2001) is a Filipino actor, host, and model who is currently an artist under GMA Network. He is the son of actor-turned-politician and former mayor of Manila, Isko Moreno.

Life and career 
Domagoso is one of Isko Moreno and his wife Diana Lynn Ditan's five children. He is named after his paternal grandfather.

In 2019, Domagoso signed a contract with GMA Artist Center (now Sparkle) and became a semi-regular cast of the defunct variety show Studio 7. He later became a mainstay in All-Out Sundays since 2020.

In 2021, Domagoso was paired with Cassy Legaspi in the romantic comedy series First Yaya and its continuation, First Lady.

Then twenty-year-old Domagoso and social media personality girlfriend Raffa Castro, daughter of actor-turned-broadcast journalist Diego Castro and sister of actress Claire Castro, welcomed their son Scott Angelo on April 28, 2022, named after the childhood nickname of Domagoso's father Isko Moreno and Castro's late grandfather Angelo Castro Jr. The news was initially reported by Cristy Fermin and later confirmed by Philippine Entertainment Portal in late June 2022, two months after Castro gave birth. Domagoso was reportedly hands-on during Castro's pregnancy and kept the pregnancy private from the public eye during his father's campaign for the 2022 presidential elections, though Domagoso has never denied earlier rumors and had initially expressed intention to publicly reveal the identity of the child. Domagoso and Castro's relationship and parenthood are supported by their respective parents.

On November 23, 2022, Domagoso won the Best Actor award for his performance in That Boy In The Dark, directed by Adolf Alix Jr., at the 16th Toronto Film and Script Awards in Toronto, Canada. On December 23, 2022, Domagoso received another award as Best Actor at the 2022 Five Continents International Film Festival (FCIFF), an online festival in Venezuela. On December 26, he also won the Best Actor award at the Boden International Film Festival (BIFF) 2022 of Sweden. On February 2, 2023, he was awarded the Best Youth Actor Award at the 2023 New York Independent Cinema Awards. Domagoso has been recognized as the "Iconic Young Actor Ace of the Year" and "Promising Young Actor of the Year" by the Global Iconic Aces Awards 2022, and the 2022 Philippine Faces of Success, respectively.

Filmography

Television

Films

References

External links 
 
 Sparkle profile

2001 births
Living people
Filipino television personalities
Filipino male television actors
Filipino male models
GMA Network personalities
Male actors from Manila
Filipino people of Spanish descent
Filipino television variety show hosts